Hasnapur is a village in Nawabganj block of Unnao district, Uttar Pradesh, India. As of 2011, its population is 917, in 159 households, and it has a pre-primary school and no healthcare facilities.

The 1961 census recorded Hasnapur as comprising 4 hamlets, with a total population of 296 (167 male and 129 female), in 60 households and 53 physical houses. The area of the village was given as 275 acres.

References

Villages in Unnao district